The men's hammer throw at the 2008 Summer Olympics took place on 15 August (qualifying) and 17 (final) at the Beijing National Stadium. There were 33 competitors from 26 nations. The event was won by Primož Kozmus of Slovenia, the nation's first medal in the event.

The original silver and bronze medalists, Vadim Devyatovskiy and Ivan Tsikhan of Belarus, were disqualified in December 2008 for testing positive for abnormal levels of testosterone. The medals were awarded to Krisztián Pars of Hungary and Koji Murofushi of Japan respectively. Tsikhan announced that he and Devyatovskiy intended to appeal the IOC's decision. In June 2010 the Court of Arbitration for Sport ruled that the disqualified Belarusians should get their original medals back due to errors at the Chinese medical lab.

Background

This was the 25th appearance of the event, which has been held at every Summer Olympics except 1896. Nine of the 12 finalists from the 2004 Games returned: gold medalist (and 2000 finalist) Koji Murofushi of Japan, bronze medalist Eşref Apak of Turkey, fourth-place finisher Vadim Devyatovskiy of Belarus, fifth-place finisher Krisztián Pars of Hungary, sixth-place finisher Primož Kozmus of Slovenia, seventh-place finisher Libor Charfreitag of Slovakia, tenth-place finisher Nicola Vizzoni of Italy, eleventh-place finisher Markus Esser of Germany, and Ivan Tsikhan of Belarus, who at the time was the 2004 silver medalist but who would later be stripped of that medal. Tsikhan was also the three-time reigning (2003, 2005, 2007) World Champion (though the 2005 result would be stripped), with Kozmus the runner-up and Charfreitag third. Szymon Ziółkowski of Poland, the 2000 Olympic and 2001 World champion (and 2005 World Champion after Tsikhan's win was vacated), returned after not making the final in 2004.

Egypt, Iceland, Latvia, and Turkmenistan each made their debut in the event. The United States appeared for the 24th time, most of any nation, having missed only the boycotted 1980 Games.

Qualification

Each National Olympic Committee (NOC) was able to enter up to three entrants providing they had met the A qualifying standard in the qualifying period (1 January 2007 to 23 July 2008). NOCs were also permitted to enter one athlete providing he had met the B standard in the same qualifying period. The maximum number of athletes per nation had been set at 3 since the 1930 Olympic Congress.

Competition format

The competition used the two-round format introduced in 1936, with the qualifying round completely separate from the divided final. In qualifying, each athlete received three attempts; those recording a mark of at least 78.00 metres advanced to the final. If fewer than 12 athletes achieved that distance, the top 12 would advance. The results of the qualifying round were then ignored. Finalists received three throws each, with the top eight competitors receiving an additional three attempts. The best distance among those six throws counted.

Records

Prior to this competition, the existing world and Olympic records were as follows:

No new world or Olympic records were set for this event.

Schedule

All times are China standard time (UTC+8)

Results

Qualifying

Qualification: 78.00 (Q) or at least 12 best performers (q) advance to the final.

Final

The final was held on 17 August. The eight highest-ranked competitors after three rounds qualified for the final three throws to decide the medals.

See also
2008 Hammer Throw Year Ranking

References

External links
  Final results
  sports-reference
  hammerthrow.wz

Athletics at the 2008 Summer Olympics
Hammer throw at the Olympics
Men's events at the 2008 Summer Olympics